Ramazan Köse (born 12 May 1988) is a Turkish football player. He plays goalkeeper for Şanlıurfaspor.

Club career
On 23 August 2022, Köse signed with Şanlıurfaspor.

References

External links
 
 Profile at TFF.org

1988 births
Footballers from Ankara
Living people
Turkish footballers
Association football goalkeepers
Gençlerbirliği S.K. footballers
Giresunspor footballers
Kasımpaşa S.K. footballers
Şanlıurfaspor footballers
Süper Lig players
TFF First League players
TFF Second League players